Manju Ray was an Indian scientist specializing in Molecular Enzymology and Cancer Biochemistry. Her research has contributed significantly to the development of anticancer drugs and understanding the differentiation process of cells. Her interests include tumor biochemistry and molecular enzymology. She was awarded the Shanti Swarup Bhatnagar Prize for Science and Technology in the year 1989, being only the second woman to receive this award in the category 'Biological Sciences'.

Education
Ray graduated from the prestigious Science college campus of Calcutta University with degrees in  M.Sc. in Physiology in 1969 and PhD in Biochemistry in 1975.

Research 
Ray started her career in the Department of Biochemistry, Indian Association of Cultivation of Science. Since December 2010, she was an Emeritus Scientist at Bose Institute, Kolkata. Ray's research has focused on understanding the biological role of methylglyoxal, a side-product of several metabolic pathways. Over the course of her career, she and her team have isolated, purified and characterized  a series of enzymes involved in methylglyoxal anabolism and catabolism. Her work has also focused on studying anticancer properties of methylglyoxal, with positive results observed in the first phase of clinical trials.

Awards
 
 1975: Indian National Science Academy (INSA) Young Scientist Medal in Biological Science
 1989: Shanti Swarup Bhatnagar Prize for Science and Technology in Biological Science
 2003: Dr. I.C. Chopra Memorial Award
 Dr. Jnan Chandra Ghosh Memorial Award

Publications
Ray has published a large number of scientific papers as lead author in association with others and some of which are:
Inhibition of respiration of tumor cells by methyl glyoxal and protection of inhibition by lactaldehyde (1991) in International Journal of Cancer
Inhibition of electron flow through complex I of the mitochondrial respiratory chain on Earlich Ascites Carsinoma cells by methyl Glyoxal (1994) in Biochemical Journal
Glyoxalase III from Escherichia coli a single novel enzyme for the conversion of methylglyoxal into D-lactate without reduced glutathione (1995) in Biochemical Journal
Methylglyoxal : From a putative intermediate of glucose breakdown to its role in understanding that excessive ATP formation in cells may lead to malignancy (1998) in Current Science
Glyceraldehyde-3-phosphate dehydrogenase from Earlich Ascites Carcinoma cells: its possible role in the high glycolysis of malignant cells (1999) in European Journal of Biochemistry

References

21st-century Indian women scientists
Indian women biochemists
Bengali chemists
21st-century Indian biologists
20th-century Indian chemists
21st-century Indian chemists
20th-century Indian women scientists
1947 births
2021 deaths
Recipients of the Shanti Swarup Bhatnagar Award in Biological Science
Women scientists from West Bengal